Safiye Sultan ("pure"  1550 – after 20 April 1619) was the Haseki Sultan (chief consort) of Murad III and Valide Sultan of the Ottoman Empire as the mother of Mehmed III and the grandmother of Sultans: Ahmed I and Mustafa I. Safiye was also one of the eminent figures during the era known as the Sultanate of Women. She lived in the Ottoman Empire as a courtier during the reigns of seven sultans: Suleiman the Magnificent, Selim II, Murad III, Mehmed III, Ahmed I, Mustafa I, and Osman II.

After the death of Selim II in 1574, Prince Murad took the throne as the new sultan in Constantinople under the name of Murad III.  Safiye was by his side and moved with him to Topkapi Palace, and less than a year into his reign she received the title of Haseki Sultan (chief consort), which placed her above the princesses.  Nurbanu, her Mother-in-law, who was with them as the Sultan's mother, was upset with Safiye's influence on Murad and wanted to replace her with another concubine of the harem. Finally, the conflict between Safiye and Nurbanu reached a crisis and Murad sent Safiye to Eski Saray. That she lived there for a year after Nurbanu's death, but Murad brought her back to him.

After 1585, she became the most powerful one in harem. Moreover, she was not contented with harem, she began to intervene in state affairs and she became one of the powerful figures of the Murad reign.  She strengthened her position in the court when she became the Valide Sultan (Sultan’s mother) upon the ascension of her son Mehmed III on the throne in 1595, after the death of Murad III. As Valide Sultan, her personal purse was three times that of the Sultan, the highest level of salary for a person in the empire. During her son's reign, Mehmed would consult her on matters if it was important and he did not make a decision if it was not her consent. People and civil servants appealed to her when they needed some help, since they knew how influential she was on the Ottoman court; sometimes they would even throw themselves in front of her carriage for help. She was the most influential in directing everything related to the empire and the terms of appointments and dismissals of everyone in the Empire, even the Grand Vizier and Shaykh al-Islam. When Mehmed III went on the campaign of Eğri in 1596, he left a treasure of one billion akçe to her service, and he gave her the power to audit important matters in his absence. She distributed alms to the poor, orphans, and widows upon the fall of Eğri Castle.

Safiye Sultan did not only interfere in interior affairs but also in foreign affairs of the empire. It is known that she corresponded by letters with foreign kings and queens and established diplomatic relations with them. Like her mother-in-law Nurbanu, she supported a pro-Venetian policy in foreign politics. But in the last years of her son's reign, her meddling in state affairs caused three destructive rebellions and made her immensely hated by the soldiers and the people. Upon the death of Mehmed III in 1603, she was sent to Eski Saray on January 9, 1604, and lived there in retirement without political influence until her death on April 20, 1619. She was laid to rest in the tomb of Murad III.

Background 
According to Venetian sources, Safiye was of Albanian origin, born in the Dukagjin highlands
but was confused for her origins with Nurbanu Sultan. Her original name was Sofia.

In 1563, at the age of 13, she was presented as a slave to the future Murad III by his cousin Hümaşah Sultan, granddaughter of Suleiman the Magnificent and Hurrem Sultan through their deceased son Şehzade Mehmed, older full brother of Murad's father Selim. Given the name Safiye, she became a concubine of Murad (then the eldest son of Sultan Selim II). On 26 May 1566, she gave birth to Murad's son, the future Mehmed III, the same year Suleiman the Magnificent died.

Haseki Sultan 

Selim II died in 1574 and Murad became the new sultan. Safiye and her children immediately traveled to the capital to settle next to Murad. Almost as she arrived in Istanbul, Safiye immediately received the Haseki rank and a salary of 800 aspers per day. However, her new life in Istanbul also meant that Nurbanu, deeply loved and revered by Murad, would be part of their private lives. Of course, Nurbanu, as the Valide and head of the harem, ruled over the entire palace and family, and Safiye lived as a Haseki under the shadow of her mother-in-law. For the first few years, even if there were tensions in the harem, there was no open fight between the two women. However, Safiye sought to gain political power, which was a completely logical move as the mother of princes. However, Nurbanu Sultan did not appreciate her daughter-in-law’s aspirations in political life, nor her attempt to influence Sultan Murad. Because Safiye threatened Nurbanu supremacy over the family and her control over Murad and through him over his empire.

Safiye had been Murad's only concubine before his accession, and he continued having a monogamous relationship with her for several years into his sultanate. His mother Nurbanu advised him to take other concubines for the good of the dynasty, which by 1581 had only one surviving heir, Murad and Safiye's son Mehmed. In 1583, Nurbanu accused Safiye of using witches and sorcerers to render Murad impotent and prevent him from taking new concubines. This resulted in the imprisonment, exile, torture and execution of Safiye's close friends and servants. Also offended by his masculinity, Murad - who tended to believe in witchcraft, astrology, so presumably seriously believed the rumor - finally, in early 1583 (or even in 1582), actually banished Safiye to the Eski Saray (Old Palace). Murad's sister Ismihan presented him with two beautiful concubines, which he accepted. Cured of his impotence, he went on to father twenty sons and twenty-seven daughters.

Venetian reports state that after an initial bitterness, Safiye kept her dignity and showed no jealousy of Murad's concubines. She even procured more for him, earning the gratitude of the Sultan, who continued to value her and consult her on political matters, especially after the death of Nurbanu. During Murad's latter years, Safiye returned to being his only companion. However, it is unlikely that Safiye ever became Murad's wife—though the Ottoman historian Mustafa Ali refers to her as such, he is contradicted by reports from the Venetian and English ambassadors.

After Nurbanu's death and his return to Topkapi Palace, by then, Safiye had perhaps been disillusioned with Murad and was only interested in gaining power. As Murad discussed all matters with Safiye and let her gain power. She was influential and powerful as a Haseki, a rank bestowed on her less than a year after Murad ascended the throne.
As Giovanni Moro reported in 1590 with the authority she {Safiye} enjoys as mother of the prince, she intervenes on occasion in affairs of state, although she is much respected in this, and is listened to by His Majesty who considers her sensible and wise. It was during this period that Safiye also built her own all-intertwined relationship system and began to immerse herself in every corner of politics. With the support of the chief eunuch, Gazanfer Aga, she influenced Murad's decisions more and easier, and gained more power which made some Grand Viziers very uncomfortable. Of course, Koca Sinan Pasha, who was Grand Vizier for three terms during Murad's reign, was her supporter.

As much as Safiye could hate her mother-in-law, she continued her pro-Venice policy. She also stood openly in front of Murad for the sake of interests the Venice as Haseki. Although she was able to influence the sultan in many ways, she did not always manage to shape the events according to her own taste. Thus, for example, in 1593 she tried to convince Murad, in favor of the English ambassador she had favored. However, Murad hardly listened, already rejecting Safiye’s offer. Thus, although her power and influence grew during Murad’s reign and she achieves many of her interests, and she more or less took Murad's place in ruling the empire, but the Sultan also set serious boundaries for her.

Issue
It is believed that Safiye Sultan had monogamous relationship with Murad and that she was his only concubine between 1562 and 1582.

From Murad, Safiye had at least five children, two sons and three daughters:
 Hümaşah Sultan (Manisa, c. 1564 – Constantinople, after 1606)
 Ayşe Sultan (Manisa, 1565 – Constantinople, May 15, 1605).
 Mehmed III (Manisa, May 16 or 26, 1566 – Constantinople, December 21 or 22, 1603); he succeeded his father as Ottoman sultan.
 Şehzade Mahmud (Manisa, 1568 – Constantinople, 1580/1581).
Fatma Sultan (Manisa, before 1574 – Constantinople, 1620).

Also, since they were born during Murad's years of monogamy, she was also probably, but not certainly, mother of:
Şehzade Selim (Manisa, 1567? – Constantinople, 28 January 1595, executed by Mehmed III)
Mihrimah Sultan (Constantinople, 1579? – Constantinople, after 1625)
Fahriye Sultan (died in 1656, buried in Murad III Mausoleum, Hagia Sophia Mosque), called also Fahri Sultan. Possibly daughter with Safiye, perhaps born after her mother's return from exile in Old Palace. She married firstly to Cuhadar Ahmed Pasha, Governor of Mosul, married secondly to Damad Sofu Bayram Pasha, sometime Governor of Bosnia. 

In addition to these, a European braggart, Alexander of Montenegro, claimed to be the lost son of Murad III and Safiye Sultan, presenting himself with the name of Şehzade Yahya and claiming the throne for it. His claims were never proven and are not believed to be true by modern historians.

Valide Sultan 

When Murad died in 1595, Safiye arranged for her son Mehmed to succeed as a sultan, and she became the Valide Sultan—one of the most powerful in Ottoman history. Committed to his mother to the extreme, the new sultan essentially allowed his mother to rule and gain influence. From then on, no one and nothing could set a limit to Safiye’s will. When she became Valide Sultan in 1595, she became more active in internal and foreign affairs, Until her son's death in 1603, Ottoman politics were determined by a party headed by herself and Gazanfer Ağa, chief of the white eunuchs and head of the enderun (the imperial inner palace). She had to handle serious internal struggles and struggles with the army instead of her son. She gave money for the war expenses from her personal account to support her son.

Safiye arranged the highest allowance ever for herself as Valide Sultan. She eventually enjoyed an enormous stipend of 3,000 aspers a day during the latter part of her son's reign. When Mehmed III went on the Eger campaign in Hungary in 1596, he gave his mother great power over the empire, leaving her in charge of the treasury. During her interim rule she persuaded her son to revoke a political appointment of the judgeship of Istanbul and to reassign to the grand vizierate to Damat Ibrahim Pasha, her son-in-law. So no one could do anything in the capital, or even in the whole empire, without Safiye’s permission. She during the 9-year reign of her son has even been accused of corruption in his government and of selling important and lucrative positions at the highest price offered.

During this period, the secretary of the English ambassador reported that while in the palace, Safiye "spied a number of boats upon the river [the Bosphorus] hurrying together. The Queen Mother sent to enquire of the matter [and] was told that the Vizier did justice upon certain chabies [kahpe], that is, whores. She, taking displeasure, sent word and advised [the Vizier] that her son had left him to govern the city and not to devour the women; [thus] commanding him to look well to the other business and not to meddle any more with the women till his master's return."

The greatest crisis Safiye endured as a valide sultan stemmed from her reliance on her kira, Esperanza Malchi. A kira was a non-Muslim woman (typically Jewish) who acted as an intermediary between a secluded woman of the harem and the outside world, serving as a business agent and secretary. 
Malchi reportedly attempted to influence Safiye (and through her the sultan) negatively in their policy toward the Republic of Venice in conflict with the Venetian spy Beatrice Michiel, which on at least one occasion caused an open conflict at court.
In 1600, the imperial cavalry rose in rebellion at the influence of Malchi and her son, who had amassed over 50  million aspers in wealth. Safiye was held responsible for this, along with the debased currency the troops were paid with, and nearly suffered the wrath of the soldiers, who brutally killed Malchi and her son. Mehmed III was forced to say "he would counsel his mother and correct his servants." To prevent the soldiers from suspecting her influence over the Sultan, Safiye persuaded Mehmed to have his decrees written out by the Grand Vizier, instead of personally signing them.

Safiye was instrumental in the execution of her grandson Mahmud in 1603, having intercepted a message sent to his mother by a religious seer, who predicted that Mehmed III would die in six months and be succeeded by his son. According to the English ambassador, Mahmud was distressed at "how his father was altogether led by the old Sultana his Grandmother and the state went to Ruin, she respecting nothing but her own desire to get money, and often lamented thereof to his mother," who was "not favored of the Queen mother." The prince was therefore a serious threat to her and her son's reign. The sultan, provoked by her, suspecting a plot and jealous of his son's popularity, had him strangled.

Mehmed III was succeeded by his son Ahmed I in 1603. One of his first major decisions was to deprive his grandmother of power—she was banished to the Old Palace on Friday, 9 January 1604. This was the end of her reign, which lasted for 19 years through her husband and son. When Ahmed I's brother Mustafa I became sultan in 1617, his mother Halime Sultan received 3,000 aspers as valide sultan although her mother-in-law Safiye was still alive. However, Halime received only 2,000 aspers during her retirement to the Old Palace between her son's two reigns; during the first months of her retirement Safiye was still alive, perhaps a neighbor in the Old Palace, receiving 3,000 aspers a day while the Haseki Sultan of Ahmed I, Kösem Sultan also living in the Old Palace, received 1,000 aspers a day.

All succeeding sultans were descended from Safiye.

Foreign relations 
Safiye, like Nurbanu, advocated a generally pro-Venetian policy and regularly interceded on behalf of the Venetian ambassadors, one of whom described her to the senate as "a woman of her word, trustworthy, and I call say that in her alone have I found truth in Constantinople; therefore it will always benefit Your Serenity to promote her gratitude."

Safiye also maintained good relations with England. She persuaded Mehmed III to let the English ambassador accompany him on campaign in Hungary. One unique aspect of her career is that she corresponded personally with Queen Elizabeth I of England, volunteering to petition the Sultan on Elizabeth's behalf. The two women also exchanged gifts. On one occasion, Safiye received a portrait of Elizabeth in exchange for "two garments of cloth of silver, one girdle of cloth of silver, [and] two handkerchiefs wrought with massy gold." In a letter from 1599, Safiye responds to Elizabeth's request for good relations between the empires:

Safiye had the carriage covered and used it on excursions to town, which was considered scandalous. This exchange of letters and gifts between Safiye and Elizabeth presented an interesting gender dynamic to their political relationship. In juxtaposition to the traditional means of exchanging women in order to secure diplomatic, economic, or military alliances, Elizabeth and Safiye's exchange put them in the position of power rather than the objects of exchange.

An unusual occurrence in Safiye's relationship with England was her attraction to Sir Paul Pindar, secretary to English ambassador and deliverer of Elizabeth's coach. According to Thomas Dallam (who presented Elizabeth's gift of an organ to Mehmed III), "the sultana did take a great liking to Mr. Pinder, and afterward, she sent for him to have his private company, but their meeting was crossed."

Public works 

Safiye is also famous for starting the construction of Yeni Mosque, the "new mosque" in Eminönü, Istanbul, in 1597. Part of Istanbul's Jewish quarter was razed to make way for the structure, whose massive building costs made Safiye unpopular with the soldiery, who wanted her exiled. At one point Mehmed III temporarily sent her to the Old Palace. Though she returned, she did not live to see the mosque completed. After Mehmed died, Safiye lost power and was permanently exiled to the Old Palace. The mosque's construction was halted for decades. It was finally completed in 1665 by another valide sultan, Turhan Hatice, mother of Mehmed IV.

Masjid al-Malika Safiyya 

The Al-Malika Safiye Mosque in Cairo is named in Safiye's honor. The mosque of al-Malika Safiyya derives its name more by appropriation than by real patronage. It was started by 'Uthman Agha, who held the post of the Agha Dar al-Sa'ada, or black eunuch in charge of the harem, as well as the Egyptian waqf estates of the holy places in the Hijaz. 'Uthman Agha was the agent and slave of the noble Venetian beauty Safiya, of the Baffo family, who had been captured by corsairs and presented to the imperial harem, where she became chief consort of Sultan Murad III (1574–95) and virtual regent for her son, Sultan Mehmed III (1595-1603). 'Uthman died before the mosque was completed, and it went to Safiya as part of his estate. She endowed the mosque with a deed that provided for thirty-nine custodians including a general supervisor, a preacher, the khatib (orator), two imams, timekeeper, an incense burner, a repairman, and a gardener.

Death 
Safiye Sultan died during the reign of her great-grandson Osman II, on 20 April 1619. Safiye was buried in Murad III's tomb, Hagia Sofia.

In literature and popular culture 
In Ann Chamberlin’s Sofia, she is depicted as a 14-year-old Venetian noble girl who was taken by Corsairs to Constantinople. 
In Katie Hickman's The Aviary Gate, which talks about Safiye Sultan's interactions with an English merchant and the story of an English captive in the harem, she appears as an important character. It shows a detailed explanation of how she ended up in the harem from her homeland in Albanian mountains. 
In the 2011 TV series Muhteşem Yüzyıl, Young Safiye Sultan is portrayed by Turkish actress Gözde Türker. She is gifted to Murad by Mihrimah Sultan, Murad's aunt, instead of Hümaşah.
In the 2015 TV series Muhteşem Yüzyıl: Kösem, Safiye Sultan is portrayed by Turkish actress Hülya Avşar.

See also
 Lists of mosques
 List of mosques in Africa
 List of mosques in Egypt
Ottoman dynasty
Ottoman family tree
List of Valide Sultans
List of consorts of the Ottoman Sultans

Notes

References 

 
 
 
  
 
  
 

1550s births
1619 deaths
Converts to Sunni Islam from Catholicism
Valide sultan
16th-century consorts of Ottoman sultans
17th-century consorts of Ottoman sultans
Ottoman former Christians
Albanians from the Ottoman Empire
16th-century Albanian people
17th-century Albanian people